Malá Víska is a municipality and village in Beroun District in the Central Bohemian Region of the Czech Republic. It has about 100 inhabitants.

Geography
It is located in the Brdy mountain range and the eponymous protected landscape area.

History
The first written mention of Malá Víska is from 1520.

Gallery

References

Villages in the Beroun District